Mansourah is a district in Ghardaïa Province, Algeria. It was named after its capital, Mansoura.

Municipalities
The district is further divided into 2 municipalities:
Mansoura
Hassi Fehal

References

Districts of Ghardaïa Province